Quan Song Wen is a 360-volume Chinese collection of prose literature from the Song dynasty (960–1279), first fully published in 2006 jointly by Shanghai Lexicographical Publishing House and Anhui Education Publishing House (安徽教育出版社). More than 170,000 writings by more than 9000 authors are featured in the collection, and its compilation (including indexing, punctuation and necessary annotation) took more than 20 years by Sichuan University Institute for Ancient Classics and Archives (古籍整理研究所).

References

Song dynasty literature